= Aragokome =

Town of ancient Phrygia

Coordinates: 39°04′19″N 30°10′10″E

Aragokome was a town of ancient Phrygia, inhabited in Roman times.

Its site is located near Yapılcan in Asiatic Turkey.
